Monnetyra diabolica is a species of beetle in the family Cerambycidae, and the only species in the genus Monnetyra. It was described by Galileo and Martins in 2003.

References

Lamiinae
Beetles described in 2003
Monotypic beetle genera